The plastics industry manufactures polymer materials—commonly called plastics—and offers services in plastics important to a range of industries, including packaging, building and construction, electronics, aerospace,Manufacturing and transportation.

It is part of the chemical industry. In addition, as mineral oil is the major constituent of plastics, it therefore forms part of the  petrochemical industry.

Besides plastics production, plastics engineering is an important part of the industrial sector. The latter field is dominated by engineering plastic as raw material because of its better mechanical and thermal properties than the more widely used commodity plastics.

Companies

Markets
According to PlasticsEurope, the top three markets for plastics are packaging, building and construction, and automotive.

Production
Plastics production has been growing globally. The numbers include thermoplastics and polyurethanes, as well as thermosets, adhesives, coatings and sealants and PP-fibers. Data was gathered by PlasticsEurope (PEMRG) and Consultic, or the nova-institute.

However, in 2020 the COVID-19 pandemic has had a devastating effect on the fossil fuel and petrochemical industry. Natural gas prices have dropped so low that gas producers were burning if off on-site (not being worth the cost to transport it to cracking facilities). In addition, bans on single-use consumer plastic (in China, the European Union, Canada, and many countries in Africa), and bans on plastic bags (in several states in the USA) has reduced demand for plastics considerably. Many cracking facilities in the USA have been suspended. The petrochemical industry has been trying to save itself by attempting to rapidly expand demand for plastic products worldwide (i.e. through pushbacks on plastic bans and by increasing the number of products wrapped in plastic in countries where plastic use is not already as widespread (i.e. developing nations)).

History

 Alexander Crum Brown discovered the carbon double bond in ethylene
 James Swinburne, the Father of British Plastics, revolutionized the plastics industry in Europe. 
 Leo Baekeland, whom created the first plastic, Bakelite.
 Hermann Staudinger, who received the Nobel Prize for his discoveries of Macromolecules and Polymers, the chemical backbone of plastics.

Associations

United States
 American Plastics Council (trade association)
 Society of the Plastics Industry
 American Chemistry Council

Europe
 European Polymer Federation (scientific)

United Kingdom
 British Plastics Federation (trade association)

India
 Plastindia

International
 International Association of Plastics Distributors
 Society of Plastics Engineers

Countries and sites
 Beccles is a town in England which is a center of the plastics industry
 Erie, Pennsylvania is a center of the plastics industry in the United States
 Oyonnax is called Plastic Valley in France
 Stenungsund is a town in Sweden which is considered to be a centre for the plastic industry in Scandinavia

Initiatives 
 Plastics 2020 Challenge
 Plastics Free July

Journals and conferences
Plastics News
Plastics News Global Group

Trade Shows
 NPE – National Plastics Expo (USA)
 Chinaplas (China)
 K (Germany)
 Plastimagen (Mexico)
 Plastindia and Plastivision (India)
 Plastpol (Poland)
 Interplas (United Kingdom)
 Interplastica (Russia)

See also
Economics of plastics processing
Plastic pollution
Dedicated bio-based chemical
Drop-in bioplastic
 Thermoplastic

References

External links

 
Industries (economics)